K Bye for Now (SWT Live) is the debut live album by American singer Ariana Grande. It was released on December 23, 2019, featuring Grande's setlist from her Sweetener World Tour in 2019, which contains guest appearances from Big Sean, Childish Gambino, Nicki Minaj and Zedd. All of its tracks were produced by Grande and Natural. The album reached number 79 on the Billboard 200. On June 12, 2021, CD and vinyl versions of the album were released for Record Store Day.

Background
Grande embarked on the Sweetener World Tour starting in March 2019 to support her albums Sweetener (2018) and Thank U, Next (2019). On October 17, 2019, Grande tweeted a photo of her editing vocal files on her laptop and wrote "about to start coming thru and picking my favorite adlibs / performance moments on this flight ... just in case u want a live album one day". In November 2019, Grande continued to tease the album by sharing more photos onto Instagram of audio files named after different cities she performed in. On December 1, 2019, Grande shared an update on the production of the album.

On December 10, 2019, Grande responded affirmatively to a fan that had asked if a live album would arrive before the year's end. On December 11, 2019, the album was put up for pre-saving on Spotify under the tentative title SWT Live and Grande shared the track listing on her Instagram. On December 22, 2019, Grande revealed on Twitter that the album would be titled K Bye for Now and would be released later that night following her final show of the Sweetener World Tour in Inglewood, California.

Critical reception

Dani Blum from Pitchfork gave the album a rating of 7.4 out of 10 stating, "Grande's live album is both a capsule and a capstone, encompassing a nine-month, 102-show tour at what might be the peak of her career."

Commercial performance
K Bye for Now (SWT Live) debuted at number 97 on the Billboard 200. As of June 2020, the live album has sold 4,000 copies in the United States. The album was released to music streaming and digital platforms. The album re-entered the Billboard 200 at number 79 in June 2021, when CDs and vinyl copies of the album were released.

Track listing
All tracks are noted as "live", and produced by Grande and Natural.

Notes
 Live version of "Thank U, Next" contains an excerpt from "Video" by India Arie

Personnel

Production
Ariana Grande – vocals, lyrics, composer, production, vocal production, vocal arranger, mixing, engineering 
Natural – production, musical director, mixing, engineering 
Randy Merrill – mastering engineer
Tommy Brown – composer
Mr. Franks – composer
Max Martin – composer
Victoria Monét – composer
Savan Kotecha – composer
Ilya Salmanzadeh – composer
Pop Wansel – composer
Brian Malik Baptiste – composer
Babyface – composer
The Rascals – composer
Pharrell Williams – composer
Cole Potter – composer
Charles Anderson – composer
Nicholas Audino – composer
Anton Zaslavskli – composer

Musicians
Ariana Grande – vocals
Aaron Spears – drums
Natural – guitar, keyboard
Eric Ingram – bass, synth bass
Nelson Jackson – keyboard

Charts

Release history

References

2019 live albums
Ariana Grande albums
Republic Records live albums